"Sweet Little Jesus Boy" is a spiritual Christmas song composed by Robert MacGimsey and published in 1934 by Carl Fischer Music. Baritone Lawrence Tibbett was the first to record it. Robert Merrill recorded his version in 1947 (Victor 10-1303).

See also
 List of Christmas carols

References

American Christmas songs
Songs about children
Songs about Jesus
1934 songs
Songs written by Robert MacGimsey